Yogi Naraharinath (born: Balbir Singh Hriksen Thapa, 1915–2003 CE) was a Nepali historian, writer and saint of Nath tradition of Gorakhnath. He has written over 600 books in 28 different languages and has performed 129 Koti Homs throughout Nepal.

Early life 
He was born at Lalu village, Kalikot district on 17th Falgun 1971 of Bikram Samvat as Balbir Singh Hriksen Thapa (बलवीरसिंह ऋक्सेन थापा) to father Lalit Singh Hriksen Thapa and mother Gauri Devi. He belonged to Khas clan of Hriksen Thapa Chhetri who falls in Bhardwaj Gotra of Hinduism. He migrated to India aged eight and learned Sanskrit language. He later became noted historian and saint of Gorakhnath tradition and resided at Mrigasthali, Kathmandu near the holy temple of Pashupatinath.

Works 
He has written over 570 books of which 114 were published. His works includes collection and decryption of documents Khas language (ancient Nepali language) to readable Nepali which mostly included genealogies. He has worked on many genealogies like Gorkha Bansawali, Yogi Bansawali, Devmala Banshawali which were found in Dang district. According to Devmala Bansawali, he produced some claims regarding Victorian King Vikramaditya. He has also provided contributions to Nepal Sanskrit University at Dang. He was jailed for his political views on strong Hinduistic country and calling then ruling monarchy as weak. He also sent letter in Sanskrit language to Indian Prime Minister Atal Behari Vajpayee requesting India to be declared a Hindu nation. He also believed liberty of religion and opposed non-allowance of non-Hindus at Pashupatinath Temple. He called the lord of the temple being common to all religions. He was also nicknamed Walking Pashupatinath by Swami Karpatri.

Some of his online books are:
Hamro desa-darshana
Pashupatimatam: Sivadharmamahasastram Pashupatinathadarshanam
Divya Upadesa: Anuvadasahita
Aitihasika yatra: Narrative poem on cultural history of Nepal
Arthika Sahayog

Death 
He died aged 88 on 13th Falgun, 2059 B.S. at Gorakhnath premise of Mrigasthali, Kathmandu.

References

External links 
Commemorative Stamp issued on Yogi Naraharinath

Nepalese scholars
Ascetics
Hindu saints
1915 births
2003 deaths
Hindu yogis
Hindu spiritual teachers
Tantra
20th-century Nepalese people
Nepalese yogis
People from Kalikot District